Notoaeschna sagittata is a species of Australian dragonfly of the family Telephlebiidae,
known as the southern riffle darner. 
It is endemic to eastern Australia, occurring south of the Hunter River, New South Wales, where it inhabits rapid streams.

Notoaeschna sagittata is a large, dark brown to black dragonfly with yellow markings.
It appears similar to Notoaeschna geminata, the northern riffle darner, which occurs north of the Hunter River.

Gallery

See also
 List of Odonata species of Australia

References

Telephlebiidae
Odonata of Australia
Insects of Australia
Endemic fauna of Australia
Taxa named by René Martin
Insects described in 1901